Giovan Battista di Crollalanza (19 May 1819 – 8 March 1892) was an Italian writer. From 1841 he published works on many topics and in several genres, among them histories, plays and poetry. From the 1870s he wrote only on heraldry.

His Giornale araldico-genealogico-diplomatico, a monthly periodical of heraldry, started publication in 1873, and ceased only in 1905. His Annuario della nobiltà italiana ("yearbook of the Italian nobility"), a genealogical almanach of Italian noble families and the first of its kind in the new Kingdom of Italy, started publication in 1879; as with the Giornale, his sons, first Goffredo, later Aldo, took over publication after his death.

His last and major work was the Dizionario storico-blasonico delle famiglie nobili e notabili italiane estinte e fiorenti, a heraldic-historical dictionary of the Italian nobility. It was published in Pisa in three volumes between 1886 and 1890.

References 

1819 births
1892 deaths
People from Fermo
19th-century Italian writers
19th-century Italian male writers